The Dictatorship of Garibaldi or Dictatorial Government of Sicily was the provisional executive that Giuseppe Garibaldi appointed to govern the territory of Sicily during the Expedition of the Thousand in 1860. It governed in opposition to the Bourbons of Naples.

History
On 14 May 1860 in Salemi, Garibaldi announced that he was assuming dictatorship over Sicily, in the name of Victor Emmanuel II of Italy. On 17 May, Francesco Crispi was appointed First Secretary of State.

The Redshirts advanced to Palermo, the capital of the island, and launched a siege on 27 May. On 2 June 1860 in Palermo were appointed four secretaries of State and created six departments. Created the Sicilian Army and a fleet of the government of Sicily.

The pace of Garibaldi's victories had worried Cavour, who in early July sent him a proposal of immediate annexation of Sicily to Piedmont. Garibaldi, however, refused vehemently to allow such a move until the end of the war. Cavour's envoy, Giuseppe La Farina, was arrested and expelled from the island. He was replaced by the more malleable Agostino Depretis, who gained Garibaldi's trust and was appointed as pro-dictator.

The dictatorial government ended 2 December 1860, while November, 4, the annexation of the Kingdom of Italy was ratified by the popular plebiscite of 21 October.

First Secretary of State 
Francesco Crispi  (17 May – 18 July 1860)
Giuseppe Sirtori (18 – 22 July 1860), pro-dictator
Agostino Depretis  (22 July – 14 September 1860), pro-dictator
Antonio Mordini (17 September – 2 December 1860), pro-dictator

See also
Expedition of the Thousand
Kingdom of the Two Sicilies
Kingdom of Sicily
Sicilian revolution of 1848

Notes

Sources

Italian unification
1860 in Italy
19th century in Sicily
Giuseppe Garibaldi
1860 establishments in the Kingdom of the Two Sicilies
States and territories established in 1860
States and territories disestablished in 1860